Badejan Akhureh (also Romanized as Bādejān Ākhūreh; also known as Bādejān Ākhoreh and Bādjān) is a village in Barf Anbar Rural District, in the Central District of Fereydunshahr County, Isfahan Province, Iran. At the 2006 census, its population was 303, in 70 families.

References 

Populated places in Fereydunshahr County